KKWE (89.9 FM) is a radio station licensed to serve White Earth, Minnesota and surrounding area.  The station is owned by the White Earth Land Recovery Project, a Native American-run nonprofit organization. It airs a variety of music and talk programming, much of which is native-oriented.

Though KKWE is licensed to serve White Earth, its signal reaches many other communities, including much of the White Earth native reservation as well as populous cities like Detroit Lakes and Park Rapids. Its studios are located in the town of Callaway, which is north of Detroit Lakes on Highway 59 (hence references to "59" in program names and other functions).

The station was assigned the KKWE call letters by the Federal Communications Commission on May 19, 2010, and was granted its License to Cover on November 16, 2011. Program testing initially commenced in early October 2011 with an automated "soft oldies" type format. The station's current format, and the Niijii Radio brand, were launched at 11:11 AM on November 11, 2011 (11/11/11).

In addition to locally produced programs, KKWE carries programming from Pacifica such as Democracy Now; as well as Native Voice One programs, such as Native America Calling and National Native News.

KKWE is presently on the air in violation of its conditions of FCC licensing SEE:47 CFR § 73.503a as their IRS 501(c).3 nonprofit status was revoked on May 15, 2021.

The link can be found HERE

Exit from, and return to, the airwaves

After reportedly suffering a variety of hardships (transmitter failure & burglary/vandalism at the studio) KKWE went dark sometime in late summer 2012. WELRP made public their hopes to resolve the outstanding issues and put the station back on the air in the near future.

According to the station's website, KKWE was able to return to the air on the morning of November 11, 2012, with further details to be announced at a later date.

KKWE is a community radio station funded through memberships, grants, and underwriting support.  A large amount of in kind support comes from numerous volunteers.

See also
List of community radio stations in the United States

References

External links
KKWE official website
Archive of airchecks from KKWE, including Niijii format launch

Native American radio
Radio stations in Minnesota
Radio stations established in 1979
1979 establishments in Minnesota
Community radio stations in the United States